The Tapajós National Forest is a Brazilian national forest in the state of Pará, Brazil.
It supports sustainable exploitation of the natural resources in an area of Amazon rainforest.

Location

It is in the municipalities of Belterra, Aveiro, Rurópolis and Placas in the state of Pará.

The unit is bounded by the Tapajós, the Cupari River, a tributary of the Tapajós, and the BR-163 Santarém–Cuiabá road.
Part of the forest drains into the Tapajós to the west, and part drains into the Curuá Una River basin to the east.
The Moju River, a tributary of the Curuá-Una, rises in the forest.
The side of the forest along the banks of the Tapajós has elevations of about  cut by ravines and deep valleys. 
The flat areas are periodically flooded in the rainy season.

Environment

The Tapajós National Forest is in the Amazon biome.

Forest coverage includes dense rainforest with emergent trees, alluvial rainforest flooded for part of the year, open tropical forest with palms a vines, and secondary forest along the borders and access routes.
Species of trees include Aniba canelilla, Aspidosperma carapanaúba, Attalea maripa, Bertholletia excelsa (Brazil nut), Carapa guianensis, Carapa guianensis, Ceiba pentandra, Copaifera Ducke, Cordia goeldiana, Coumarouma odorata, Dinizia excelsa, Genipa americana, Hura creptans, Inga disticla, Lecythis paraensis, Macrolopium campestre, Mauritia flexuosa, Mauritia flexuosa, Mezilaurus itauba, Minguarita guianensis, Nectandra amazonium, Oenocarpus bacaba,  Orbignia martiana, Protium species, Spondia lutear, Vatairea paraensis and Xilopia species.

Conservation

The Tapajós National Forest was created by decree 73.684 of 19 February 1974, modified by law 12.678 of 25 June 2012.
It is administered by the Chico Mendes Institute for Biodiversity Conservation (ICMBio).
It is classed as IUCN protected area category VI (protected area with sustainable use of natural resources).
The objective is sustainable use of forest resources and scientific research, with emphasis on methods for sustainable exploitation of native forests.
Protected species include white-bellied spider monkey (Ateles belzebuth), white-cheeked spider monkey (Ateles marginatus), giant anteater (Myrmecophaga tridactyla), jaguar (Panthera onca), giant armadillo (Priodontes maximus) and giant otter (Pteronura brasiliensis).

This is an international research initiative by Harvard University and Brazil's National Institute for Space Research(INPE).
It investigates the way in which changes in land use and climate will affect the chemical, biological, and physical functions of the Amazon region and the global climate.

The proposed South Amazon Ecological Corridor would link the national forest to other protected areas and indigenous territories in the region.
The forest is in a region that contains 12 sustainable use conservation areas and 6 fully protected areas.
The fully protected areas, which cover , are the Amazônia, Jamanxim, Rio Novo and Serra do Pardo national parks, the Nascentes da Serra do Cachimbo Biological Reserve and the Terra do Meio Ecological Station.

Notes

Sources

1974 establishments in Brazil
National forests of Brazil
Protected areas of Pará